Dirk Hartog (baptised 30 October 1580 – buried 11 October 1621) was a 17th-century Dutch sailor and explorer. Dirk Hartog's expedition was the second European group to land in Australia and the first to leave behind an artefact to record his visit, the Hartog Plate. His name is sometimes alternatively spelled Dirck Hartog or Dierick Hartochszch. Ernest Giles referred to him as Theodoric Hartog. The Western Australian island Dirk Hartog Island is named after Hartog.

Life 

Born into a seafaring family, he received his first ship's command at the age of 30 and spent several years engaged in successful trading ventures in the Baltic and Mediterranean seas.

Hartog set sail in January 1616 in the company of several other VOC ships, but became separated from them in a storm, and arrived independently at the Cape of Good Hope (later to become the site of Cape Town, South Africa). Hartog then set off across the Indian Ocean for Batavia (present-day Jakarta), utilising (or perhaps blown off course by) the strong westerly winds known as the "Roaring Forties" which had been noted earlier by the Dutch navigator Hendrik Brouwer as enabling a quicker route to Java.

On 25 October 1616, at approximately 26° latitude south, Hartog and crew came unexpectedly upon "various islands, which were, however, found uninhabited." He made landfall at an island off the coast of Shark Bay, Western Australia, which is now called Dirk Hartog Island after him. His was the second recorded European expedition to land on the Australian continent, having been preceded by Willem Janszoon in 1606, but the first to do so on the western coastline. 

Hartog spent three days examining the coast and nearby islands. The area was named Eendrachtsland after his ship, although that name has not endured. Before Hartog left, he affixed a pewter plate to a post, now known as the Hartog plate, on which he scratched a record of his visit to the island. Its inscription (translated from the original Dutch) read:

1616 On 25 October arrived the ship Eendracht, of Amsterdam: Supercargo Gilles Miebais of Liege, skipper Dirch Hatichs of Amsterdam. on 27 d[itt]o. she set sail again for Bantam. Deputy supercargo Jan Stins, upper steersman Pieter Doores of Bil. In the year 1616.

Finding nothing of interest, Hartog continued sailing northwards along this previously uncharted coastline of Western Australia, making nautical charts up to about 22° latitude south. He then left the coast and continued on to Batavia, eventually arriving safely in December 1616, some five months after his expected arrival.

Dirk Hartog left the employ of the VOC upon his return to Amsterdam in 1618, resuming private trading ventures in the Baltic.

Postscript
In 1619 Frederik de Houtman, in the VOC ship , and Jacob d'Edel, in another VOC ship , sighted land on the Australian coast near present-day Perth which they called d'Edelsland. After sailing northwards along the coast they made landfall in Eendrachtsland. In his journal, Houtman identified these coasts with Marco Polo's land of Beach, or Locach, as shown on maps of the time such as that of Petrus Plancius and Jan Huyghen van Linschoten.

Eighty years later, on 4 February 1697, the Dutch explorer Willem de Vlamingh landed on the island and by chance found the Hartog plate, which lay half-buried in sand. He replaced it with a new plate which reproduced Hartog's original inscription and added notes of his own, and took Hartog's original back to Amsterdam, where it is housed in the Rijksmuseum.

In 2000 the Hartog plate was temporarily returned to Australia as part of an exhibition at the Australian National Maritime Museum in Sydney. This led to suggestions that the plate, considered important as the oldest-known written artefact from Australia's European history, should be acquired for an Australian museum, but the Dutch authorities have made it clear that the plate is not for sale.

In 1966 and 1985 Hartog was depicted on Australian postage stamps, both depicting his ship. In 2016 the Perth Mint issued a  silver coin to commemorate the 400th anniversary of Hartog's Australian landfall.

The island in Shark Bay, Western Australia, where he made landfall was named Dirk Hartog Island. In Amsterdam, Canberra and fourteen other Australian towns, streets have been named in his honour.

See also
 Abel Tasman 
 Dieppe maps
 Theory of the Portuguese discovery of Australia

References

Further reading

 Wendy Van Duivenvoorde, “Dutch Seaman Dirk Hartog (1583–1621) and his Ship Eendracht”, The Great Circle, vol. 38, no. 1, 2016, pp. 1–31.
 King, Robert J. "Dirk Hartog's landing on Beach, the Gold-bearing province," Map Matters, (the newsletter of the Australia on the Map Division of the Australasian Hydrographic Society), no. 10, Autumn, 2010, pp. 6–8. at: http://www.australiaonthemap.org.au/wp-content/uploads/2010/10/MapMatters10.pdf 
 King, Robert J. “Dirk Hartog lands on Beach, the Gold-bearing Province”, The Globe, No. 77, 2015, pp. 12–52.

 
 
 

1580 births
1621 deaths
17th-century Dutch explorers
Burials at the Nieuwe Kerk, Amsterdam
Explorers of Australia
Explorers of Western Australia
Maritime exploration of Australia
People from Amsterdam
Shark Bay
Sailors on ships of the Dutch East India Company
Maritime history of the Dutch East India Company